The list of acts of the 104th United States Congress includes all Acts of Congress and ratified treaties by the 104th United States Congress, which lasted from January 3, 1995 to January 3, 1997.

Acts include public and private laws, which are enacted after being passed by Congress and signed by the President, however if the President vetoes a bill it can still be enacted by a two-thirds vote in both houses. The Senate alone considers treaties, which are ratified by a two-thirds vote.

Summary of actions

President William J. Clinton vetoed the following acts of this Congress. (List of United States presidential vetoes#Bill Clinton).

 June 7, 1995: Vetoed , Emergency Supplemental Appropriations for Additional Disaster Assistance and Recissions for Fiscal Year 1995.  No override attempt made.
 August 11, 1995: Vetoed , Bosnia and Herzegovina Self-Defense Act of 1995.  No override attempt made.
 October 3, 1995: Vetoed , Legislative Branch Appropriations Act, FY 1996.  No override attempt made.
 November 13, 1995: Vetoed , Second Continuing Resolution for fiscal year 1996.  No override attempt made.
 November 13, 1995: Vetoed , Temporary Increase in the Statutory Debt Limit.  No override attempt made.
 December 6, 1995: Vetoed , Seven-Year Balanced Budget Reconciliation Act of 1995.  No override attempted.
 December 18, 1995: Vetoed , Department of the Interior and Related Agencies Appropriations Act, 1996.  Override attempt failed in House, 239-177 ( needed).
 December 18, 1995: Vetoed , Department of the Interior and Related Agencies Appropriations Act, 1996.  No override attempted.
 December 19, 1995: Vetoed , Private Securities Litigation Reform Act of 1995. Overridden by House, 319-100 ( needed).
 December 19, 1995: Vetoed , Departments of Commerce, Justice, and State, the Judiciary, and Related Agencies Appropriations Act, 1996.  Override attempt failed in House, 240-159 ( needed).
 December 28, 1995: Vetoed , National Defense Authorization Act for Fiscal Year 1996.  Override attempt failed in House, 240-156 ( needed).
 January 9, 1996: Vetoed , Personal Responsibility and Work Opportunity Act of 1995.  No override attempt made.
 April 10, 1996: Vetoed , Partial-Birth Abortion Ban Act of 1995.  Overridden in House, 285-137 ( needed).  Override attempt failed in Senate, 58-40 ( needed).
 April 12, 1996: Vetoed , Foreign Relations Authorization Act, Fiscal Years 1996 and 1997.  Override attempt failed in House, 234-188 ( needed).
 May 2, 1996:  Vetoed , Common Sense Product Liability Legal Reform Act of 1996.  Override attempt failed in House, 258-163 ( needed).
 July 30, 1996: Vetoed , Teamwork for Employees and Managers Act of 1995.  No override attempt made.
 October 2, 1996: Vetoed , Silvio O. Conte National Fish and Wildlife Refuge Eminent Domain Prevention Act.  No override attempt made.

Public laws

The following 333 Public Laws were enacted during this Congress (Congress.gov):

Private laws

Treaties

The following is a list of the treaties ratified by the United States Senate during the 104th Congress (See Senate Approved Treaties).

See also 
 List of United States federal legislation
 List of acts of the 105th United States Congress

External links

 Authenticated Public and Private Laws from the Federal Digital System
 Legislation & Records Home: Treaties from the Senate
 Public Laws for the 104th Congress at Congress.gov
 Private Laws for the 104th Congress at Congress.gov
 Treaty Documents at Congress.gov

 
104